Yvette Courault (born 10 April 1951) is a French sports shooter. She competed in two events at the 1984 Summer Olympics.

References

1951 births
Living people
French female sport shooters
Olympic shooters of France
Shooters at the 1984 Summer Olympics
Place of birth missing (living people)
20th-century French women